Regional Eurostar was a planned Eurostar train service from Paris and Brussels to locations in the United Kingdom beyond London. The services would have been run using a fleet of seven North of London, 14-coach British Rail Class 373/3 trainsets.

Beginnings
When the Channel Tunnel was first announced in the 1980s, it was part of the proposals to operate high-speed rail services through it on both sides of the English Channel with a substantial network envisaged. This was gradually reduced to a core service, along dedicated TGV-style high-speed lines, between the three capital cities, regional daytime services to Glasgow Central via the East Coast Main Line and Manchester Piccadilly via the West Coast Main Line, and Nightstar sleeper services to the same cities as well as Plymouth and Cardiff via the Great Western Main Line.

A depot for the regional Eurostar services, Manchester International Depot, was constructed at Longsight in Manchester by London and Continental Railways. A large Eurostar-branded sign was attached to the outside of the depot with the slogan "le Eurostar habite ici" (French for "the Eurostar lives here"), although the depot was empty and unused; the sign remained in place for several years after the Regional Eurostar project was abandoned.

Trial runs were undertaken using the 373/2 sets on both the East and West Coast Main Lines and passenger information signs and Eurostar lounges were installed at stations along the route. As the high-speed rail line between London and the Channel Tunnel, High Speed 1, was not under construction Eurostar services within the UK were forced to use existing rail lines and connecting junctions were built to allow Regional Eurostars access via the congested West and North London Lines. In all British Rail invested £140 million in infrastructure to allow the services to operate.

Privatisation
Regional Eurostar services were never to run. At the same time as the Channel Tunnel was nearing completion, British Rail was undergoing the long process of privatisation and regional Eurostar can be seen as a victim of it. Many had seen regional services as more a political than economic cause, a means of gaining support for the Channel Tunnel from areas of the UK outside the South-East. A parliamentary select committee in 1999 said "The regions have been cheated". The economic case for merely the inter-capital services had been questioned from the outset but by the time the Channel Tunnel was opened in 1994, backing for regional services had already started to dry up. The British Rail subsidiary European Passenger Services (EPS), which was to undertake Eurostar operations jointly with SNCF of France and NMBS/SNCB of Belgium, took ownership of the 373/2s in 1996 at the same time as it was under the process of being privatised and transferred to London and Continental Railways (LCR) who won the contract to build the CTRL and run Eurostar services.

Due to lower than forecast passenger numbers on the inter-capital services, by 1998 LCR was in financial trouble. As part of a new deal with the UK government, in 1998 LCR subcontracted its share of Eurostar operations, via Eurostar (UK), to InterCapital and Regional Rail (ICRR). As part of its bid ICRR stated that regional Eurostar services could not run without government subsidy, which the Department for Transport was unwilling to provide. The only other bidder to operate the UK share of the Eurostar operation for LCR, Richard Branson's Virgin Rail Group, claimed it was willing to run regional Eurostar services at its own risk, however it subsequently informed the UK government that it too saw them as unviable. As part of its contract LCR was not legally required to start regional Eurostar services and by 1999 it was clear that they would not operate.

British Rail, via EPS, ran a token domestic service from certain locations around the UK into Waterloo station using HSTs allowing connection with onward Eurostar service between May 1995 and January 1997 but these were ended at the time of privatisation.

Reasons given and criticism
Whilst officially regional Eurostar services have not been cancelled but are on hold or under review, there are no longer many people who expect them to operate on current lines, although this may be reconsidered if the proposed High Speed 2 line comes to fruition. The most often cited reason given why they have not run is that they are economically unviable in the current climate. The 1990s saw a huge expansion in air travel across Europe with low-cost airlines – a business that had not existed in Europe when the Channel Tunnel was planned – flying from most major cities in the UK to locations on the continent, against which regional Eurostar services, with predicted journey times of almost nine hours for Glasgow to Paris, could not compete.

Unlike other international train services within the European Union where border controls have either had a long history of operation or are no longer enforced, the UK maintains concerns about customs and immigration. The inter-capital services still operate separately from the rest of the British railway network with passport checks carried out at St Pancras, Ebbsfleet International and Ashford International stations. There was concern that similar tight control would not be possible upon regional Eurostar services where separate check-in facilities at stations did not exist.

To stop regional Eurostar services competing with domestic services in the envisioned competitive market that it was hoped the privatisation of British Rail would create, they were not to stop in London and only allowed to pick up at regional stations whilst going south and set down passengers going north. This was cited as another negative reason for their economic non-viability.

The politics of the regional Eurostar service, along with many other Channel Tunnel-related projects, have been complicated over the years. In 1999 the Department of the Environment, Transport and the Regions commissioned Arthur D. Little Ltd to write an independent report into regional Eurostar service which was published in February 2000.

Future

The opening of High Speed 1 in November 2007 brought connections to both the East Coast Main Line and North London Line (for the West Coast Main Line) at St Pancras. In addition, the maximum speed on the West Coast Main Line was increased from 110 to 125 mph in the mid-2000s (though class 373s were limited by kinematic gauging constraints to 110 mph).

Eurostar (UK) still owns several track access rights and the rights to paths on both the East Coast and West Coast Main Lines, which allowed for the possibility of such services.

A governmental "command paper" published in March 2010 proposed either a rapid transit link between HS1 and HS2 terminals, or a direct railway connection. Later announcements on 10 January 2012 suggested that the first phase of the HS2 project was to include the construction of a single track link across North London between HS2 and HS1, partially in tunnels and partially over the existing North London Line, allowing for three trains per hour in both directions. DfT proposals in 2013 stated that this link would allow HS2 trains from the North of England to bypass London Euston and connect straight to HS1, enabling direct rail services to be run from Manchester, Leeds and Birmingham to Paris, Brussels and other continental European destinations.

The proposed HS1–HS2 link was subject to some criticism and concerns were raised by Camden London Borough Council about the impact on housing, Camden Market and other local businesses from construction work of the link. Sir David Higgins, chairman of HS2 Ltd, recommended that the Camden railway link should be omitted from the parliamentary bill, stating that HS2 passengers from the North of England would easily be able to transfer from the HS2 terminal at Euston to St Pancras by London Underground, to continue their journey on HS1 to continental Europe. He also recommended that alternative plans should be drawn up to link the high-speed lines. At the second reading of the High Speed Rail Bill in April 2014, the link was omitted from the final proposals. Following this decision, London mayor Boris Johnson expressed the opinion that an HS1–HS2 link should instead be provided by boring a tunnel under Camden.

Since 2014 there have been no confirmed plans to connect HS2 to HS1, meaning that Regional Eurostar services are no longer being considered. By running south of Greater London, it would also connect Heathrow and Gatwick Airports. This scheme was rejected by the government in the same year.

Routes
Due to track arrangements, customs and competition concerns and that the Eurostar terminal was located at Waterloo station on the south side of London regional Eurostar services were not to call at London. The Summer 1999 National Rail Timetable indicates the trains would have called at the following stations, with one train per day on the ECML Glasgow route, and two running to Manchester, one via the Trent Valley line and one via the Birmingham line. The faster train would not have called at stations between Stafford and Milton Keynes.

East Coast Main Line

Glasgow Central
Edinburgh Waverley
Newcastle
Darlington
York
Leeds
Doncaster
Newark North Gate
Peterborough

West Coast Main Line

Manchester Piccadilly
Stockport
Crewe
Stafford
Wolverhampton
Birmingham New Street
Birmingham International
Coventry
Rugby
Milton Keynes Central

Slots in British Rail/Railtrack's timetables for regional Eurostar services were included for many years even though the services did not run. This factor was objected to by some train operating companies who were informed they could not run additional domestic services along the congested mainlines. The dropping of these slots around 1999/2000 was seen by many as the final admission that regional Eurostar services would not ever operate. However Eurostar still owns the rights to reinstate several paths in the future if desired.

Rolling stock

The trains to operate all these services were built at the same time as the Channel Tunnel was under construction in the late 1980s to early 1990s. The London–Paris–Brussels ("Three Capital" Class 373/1) trains are owned in groups by Eurostar International (subsidiary of LCR), SNCF and NMBS/SNCB but operate as a common pool. They consist of 18 coaches in a fixed formation. Seven shorter 14-coach North of London 373/3 were also constructed for the regional services at a cost of £180 million. All seven are owned by Eurostar International having been transferred from British Rail. Following the non-start of regional services, the trains were stored at North Pole depot in west London. Six of the seven trains have seen use at various times since.

Between 2000 and 2005, British East Coast Main Line operator Great North Eastern Railway used three train sets to provide additional domestic capacity. Branded White Rose after the White Rose of Yorkshire, sets 3301–3306 received a deep-blue livery using vinyl wraps, with 3307–3314 being stripped of their Eurostar logos to fulfill the roster when the GNER-branded sets were unavailable. On occasions a GNER vinyled half set would operate with an unvinyled half set. Initially the GNER White Rose services ran between London King's Cross and York, then, after clearance was given, between London and Leeds. The units were not permitted to be used on services north of York due to loading gauge restrictions in the Newcastle area. The sets continued to be maintained with the other Eurostar units at North Pole depot, where they returned to storage in 2005 following the end of the GNER lease. All were then leased to SNCF for domestic services in France.

The set was named Entente Cordiale and has seen use as a VIP charter train, having transported the Queen on a state visit to France and to the Entente Cordiale anniversary celebrations in 2004. On 12 June 2007 the unit was used to carry International Olympic Committee inspectors from Stratford International to London St Pancras, as a demonstration for Olympic Javelin services in 2012.

References

External links
 
 
 Official report into Regional Eurostar by the Department for Transport.
 BBC report from 1999 about the failure to run services.
 High Speed Rail to the North.

Abandoned rail transport projects in the United Kingdom
Channel Tunnel
Eurostar